Lillydale, West Virginia may refer to:
Lillydale, Monroe County, West Virginia, an unincorporated community in Monroe County
Lillydale, Wyoming County, West Virginia, an unincorporated community in Wyoming County